Mahinbanu Sultan (died 1562) was the sister of shah Tahmasp I of Persia (r. 1524–1576).

She was born to shah Ismail I.

She had a big influence during the reign of her brother, and acted as his political adviser.

References

 Hani Khafipour. The Foundations of Safavid State: fealty, patronage, and ideals of authority (1501-1576). — Chicago, Illinois: The University of Chicago, 2013. — P. 254.

16th-century births
16th-century deaths
16th-century Iranian women
Safavid princesses